Hasenclever is a German surname. Notable people with the surname include:

 Johann Peter Hasenclever (1810–1853), German painter
 Peter Hasenclever (1716–1793), German ironmaster, worked in New Jersey and New York
 Sophie Hasenclever (1823–1892), German poet and translator
 Walter Hasenclever (1890–1940), German writer
 Wilhelm Hasenclever (1837–1889), German politician

German-language surnames
de:Hasenclever